Sambavaram is a village in the Kurnool district of the Indian state of Andhra Pradesh. It is located in Gospadu Mandal of Nandyal revenue division  from NH 40.

Etymology
The word ''Sambavaram'' has a close connection with ''Parvatipuram'' (a neighboring village).

Geography
Sambavaram is in east-Deebaguntla, west-Chabolu, south-Raitunagar, National Highway 40.

Landmarks
A Saibaba temple and statue sit near National Highway 40.

Demographics
According to the 2011 census, Sambavaram has 2,813 people, including Hindus, Muslims, and Christians. Sambavaram has a total literacy rate of 53.9 percent and a female literacy rate of 21.7 percent.

Agriculture 
This village has paddies and many crops under the K. C. canal.

Education
Sambavaram has a government-run primary school.

Politics
Sambavaram is under the Nandyal Legislative Assembly.

Transport
Roads and the Nandyal railway station are the available modes of transport.

References 

Villages in Kurnool district